Ellen R. White (born circa 1922, died in 2018) of the Snuneymuxw First Nation is a Canadian aboriginal elder, author, and academic who has been recognized with a national Order of Canada and provincial Order of British Columbia.

As a young girl, Ellen trained as a midwife, assisting at births when she was just 9 years old, and delivering children by age 16.

After growing up on Vancouver Island, she moved to Nanaimo, British Columbia after marrying Doug White. She then raised her children in the Nanaimo First Nation.

After 30 years as a lecturer and storyteller at University of British Columbia, White was instrumental in establishing the First Nations Studies program at Vancouver Island University (then Malaspina College) in 1994, and spent 13 years there as an Elder-in-Residence. Known as "Auntie Ellen" to students, staff, and faculty, White received an Honorary Doctorate from VIU in 2006 for her years of dedication to education and community service. The Kwulasulwut Garden located at VIU's Nanaimo campus is dedicated to Dr. Ellen White using her Coast Salish name Kwulasulwut, meaning "many stars". The garden includes a totem pole by Coast Salish artist Jane Marston.

Ellen White is the grandmother of Snuneymuxw Chief Douglas White III.

Recognitions
 2006 - Honorary Doctorate, Vancouver Island University
 2007 - B.C. Community Achievement Award
 2011 - Order of British Columbia (BC)
 2016 - Order of Canada

Publications
 Kwulasulwut: Stories From the Coast Salish (Theytus, 1981, 1992). Illustrated by David Neel.
 Kwulasulwut II (Theytus 1997). Illustrated by Bill Cohen.

External links 

 Dr. Ellen White "A Story of Water"

References

1920s births
Living people
20th-century First Nations people
21st-century First Nations people
Coast Salish culture
Coast Salish people
Members of the Order of Canada
Members of the Order of British Columbia
People from Nanaimo
Snuneymuxw First Nation
Writers from British Columbia
Year of birth missing (living people)
First Nations women writers